Sport Vereniging Trupial (English:Sports Club), known as SV Trupial or Trupial, is an Aruban football club based in Oranjestad, which plays in Division Uno, the second tier of the national league. The team was formed in 1938.

Achievements

Aruban Division Uno: 1
2007-08

Players

Current squad
As of 10 October 2008

External links
Official website
Facebook page
Division Uno

Football clubs in Aruba
1938 establishments in Aruba
Association football clubs established in 1938